Lyons-Decatur Northeast Schools is a public school district in Lyons, Nebraska, United States.  It is a consolidated school encompassing the Communities of Decatur and Lyons, which are located in Burt County in northeast Nebraska.  It is a class D1 school. Its mascot is the Cougar.

History
The Lyons-Decatur Northeast Schools was created through a merger of the Lyons and Decatur districts in 1984.

The district implemented a 1-to-1 laptop initiative in 2008. All students in classes 10-12 had their own Macintosh laptops as of the 2009-10 school year; in the 2010-11 year this was expanded to all students in grades 9-12.

Campus
The K-12 school location in Lyons was built in 1963, with additions in 1978 and 1996.

Curriculum

Extracurricular activities
Student groups and activities include drama, FBLA, FFA, music, speech, student council, and yearbook.

The school's teams, known as the Lyons-Decatur Cougars, compete in Nebraska School Activities Association size classification D in the East Husker conference. Teams are fielded in basketball, football, golf, track, and volleyball.

Notable alumni

References

External links
 Lyons-Decatur Northeast Schools
 Lyons-Decatur Northeast Technology Wiki Page
 Decatur Alumni Association

Education in Burt County, Nebraska
School districts in Nebraska
School districts established in 1984